The 2011–12 Czech 1.liga season was the 19th season of the Czech 1.liga, the second level of ice hockey in the Czech Republic. 14 teams participated in the league, and Piráti Chomutov won the championship.

Regular season

Playoffs

Qualification round

Relegation

External links 
 Hokej.cz

2
Czech
Czech 1. Liga seasons